In the post-Reconstruction United States, Black Buck was a racial slur used to describe a certain type of African American man. In particular, the caricature was used to describe black men who absolutely refused to bend to the law of white authority and were seen as irredeemably violent, rude, and lecherous.

Background
According to popular stereotypes during the post-Reconstruction era, "Black Buck" was a black man (usually muscular or tall) who defies white will and is largely destructive to American society. One would usually be hot-tempered, excessively violent, unintelligent, and sexually attracted to white women.

Examples in media
D.W. Griffith's motion picture The Birth of a Nation (1915) is perhaps one of the best known examples of the use of the "Black Buck" stereotype in the media. 

The film sparked a national uproar, from white people who feared the film's events to be prophetic truth, and from black people who were horrified by the portrayal of their race. The film was largely responsible for the resurgence of the Ku Klux Klan during the early 20th century.

Use by white supremacists
David Duke, former Grand Wizard of the Ku Klux Klan, was quoted in The Sun newspaper of Wichita, Kansas (23 April 1975) as saying, "White people don't need a law against rape, but if you fill this room up with your normal black bucks, you would, because niggers are basically primitive animals."

See also

 Angry black woman
 African-American representation in Hollywood
 Jim Crow Museum of Racist Memorabilia
 Racial profiling
 Scientific racism
 Stereotypes of African Americans
 Stereotypes of groups within the United States

References

Further reading
 
 Patricia A. Turner, Ceramic Uncles & Celluloid Mammies: Black Images and Their Influence on Culture (Anchor Books, 1994).
 Donald Bogle, Toms, Coons, Mulattoes, Mammies and Bucks: An Interpretive History of Blacks in American Films (Continuum International, 2001)

Stereotypes of African Americans
Pejorative terms for men
Anti-African and anti-black slurs